Lander Glacier is located in the Wind River Indian Reservation, in the U.S. state of Wyoming,  WSW of Mount Lander.

See also
 List of glaciers in the United States

References

Glaciers of Fremont County, Wyoming
Glaciers of Wyoming
Wind River Indian Reservation